The 1912 Holy Cross football team was an American football team that represented the College of the Holy Cross as an independent diring the 1912 college football season. In its sixth and final year under head coach Timothy F. Larkin, the team compiled a 4–3–1 record. Frederick V. Ostergren was the team captain. Holy Cross played home games at Fitton Field on the college's campus in Worcester, Massachusetts. A new concrete grandstand was dedicated at the first home game, on October 12.

Holy Cross was scheduled to visit Army on November 2, but the game was canceled due to the funeral of United States Vice President James S. Sherman.

Schedule

References

Holy Cross
Holy Cross Crusaders football seasons
Holy Cross football